Gaurav Sharma from the University of Rochester, Rochester, New York was named Fellow of the Institute of Electrical and Electronics Engineers (IEEE) in 2013 for "contributions to electronic imaging and media security".

References

Fellow Members of the IEEE
Living people
Year of birth missing (living people)
Place of birth missing (living people)
21st-century American engineers
American electrical engineers
University of Rochester faculty